Horst Justin Junior Lehr (born 6 December 1999, Ludwigshafen am Rhein) is a German freestyle wrestler. He is a bronze medalist in the men's 57 kg event at both the 2021 World Wrestling Championships held in Oslo, Norway and the 2020 European Wrestling Championships held in Rome, Italy.

Career 

He competed in the 57 kg event at the 2019 World Wrestling Championships held in Nur-Sultan, Kazakhstan without winning a medal. He was eliminated in his second match by Nurislam Sanayev of Kazakhstan. Later that year, he represented Germany at the 2019 Military World Games held in Wuhan, China and he won one of the bronze medals in the 57 kg event.

In 2020, he won one of the bronze medals in the 57 kg event at the European Wrestling Championships held in Rome, Italy. In 2021, he won one of the bronze medals in the 57 kg event at the World Wrestling Championships held in Oslo, Norway.

He won the gold medal in his event at the 2022 European U23 Wrestling Championship held in Plovdiv, Bulgaria. A few months later, he won the silver medal in his event at the Matteo Pellicone Ranking Series 2022 held in Rome, Italy. He competed in the 57kg event at the 2022 World Wrestling Championships held in Belgrade, Serbia.

Achievements

References

External links 

 

Living people
1999 births
Place of birth missing (living people)
German male sport wrestlers
European Wrestling Championships medalists
World Wrestling Championships medalists
Sportspeople from Ludwigshafen
21st-century German people